The 1980 Player's International Canadian Open was a tennis tournament played on outdoor hard courts at the National Tennis Centre in Toronto in Canada that was part of the 1980 Volvo Grand Prix and of the 1980 WTA Tour. The tournament was held from August 11 through August 17, 1980.

Finals

Men's singles

 Ivan Lendl defeated  Björn Borg 4–6, 5–4 retired
 It was Lendl's 2nd singles title of the year and of his career.

Women's singles
 Chris Evert-Lloyd defeated  Virginia Ruzici 6–3, 6–1
 It was Evert-Lloyd's 4th title of the year and the 101st of her career.

Men's doubles
 Bruce Manson /  Brian Teacher defeated  Heinz Günthardt /  Sandy Mayer 6–3, 3–6, 6–4
 It was Manson's 1st title of the year and the 3rd of his career. It was Teacher's 3rd title of the year and the 8th of his career.

Women's doubles
 Andrea Jaeger /  Regina Maršíková defeated  Ann Kiyomura /  Betsy Nagelsen 6–1, 6–3
 It was Jaeger's 1st title of the year and the 1st of her career. It was Maršíková's 1st title of the year and the 6th of her career.

References

External links
 
 Association of Tennis Professionals (ATP) tournament profile
 Women's Tennis Association (WTA) tournament profile

Player's Canadian Open
Player's Canadian Open
Player's Canadian Open
Canadian Open (tennis)